GCN2 may refer to:

 GCN2, a symbol for EIF2AK4, an enzyme 
 Gcn2, a serine/threonine-protein kinase 
 Graphics Core Next, a series of microarchitectures for GPUs by AMD